Ammar Abo Bakr is a well-known muralist and graffiti artist in Egypt.  His work depicts the Egyptian Revolution of 2011, portraits, Egyptian history, and Egyptian pop culture. His work can be seen on Mohamed Mahmoud Street and in other places in Cairo, Alexandria, Beirut, Brussels, Amsterdam, Berlin, Cologne and Frankfurt. Abo Bakr continues to work with other artists on projects within and outside Egypt.

Biography

Ammar Abo Bakr is a mural and installation artist from Egypt. His works have cased walls in Cairo, Luxor, Alexandria, Beirut, Frankfurt, Berlin, Amsterdam and Brussels.

Ammar Abo Bakr was born on February 14, 1980. He attended Luxor Institute of Fine Arts from 1996 and 2001 where he studied painting. Beginning in 2004, Abo Bakr began researching the Egyptian people, looking for inspiration for his artwork. In addition to creating his own graffiti pieces, he was a professor at the Luxor Institute of Fine Arts where he attended school.

His Work

Ammar's work depicts the history of Egypt, Islamic culture, and his murals became a prominent site of debate and discussion during the Egyptian Revolution of 2011.  Some of his most well known murals were on Mohamed Mahmoud Street which is close to Tahrir Square where the January 25 revolution occurred.  His work is inspired by what is going on in the country at the time and by what society wants.

During and shortly after the Egyptian Revolution of 2011, his work on Mohamed Mahmoud Street was especially important because this street connects Tahrir Square and the Ministry of the Interior.  The graffiti on this street served as a "newspaper" of what was happening during the revolution. When writing about his work, Abo Bakr noted, "What we did in Egypt in recent years was not about presenting art, at least it wasn't to me: We used walls as a newspaper... Me, I was a fine arts assistant professor. I left the faculty of arts to report on the revolution in the city’s walls."

In 2012, Ammar, along with other artists started the "No Walls" campaign. This campaign was aiming to cover with graffiti all of the concrete barricades that had been put up by the government. The government put barricades up in neighborhoods, which were not only a visual sign of oppression but also inconvenienced the community members because they had to navigate through the barricades.  Along with famous artists, many community members helped paint the walls.  There were intricate murals or simple paintings of the continuation of the street behind the barricades. The goal of the campaign was to use trompe-l'œil to artistically transform the restrictive barriers put in place by Egypt's Interior Ministry, in order to make it appear as if they were not there.

Ammar is strongly connected with everyday Egyptian people.  He credits them for giving him his inspiration and creativity.  He also believes that the art in Luxor and Cairo should remain out of galleries because that limits who sees it and because art is constantly changing.

See also
 Tahrir Square
 Cairo
 Egyptian Revolution of 2011
 Arab Spring
 Graffiti
 Contemporary art in Egypt

References 

People of the Egyptian revolution of 2011
Graffiti and unauthorised signage
Egyptian artists
1980 births
Living people